Lugar railway station was a railway station serving the Lugar Ironworks, East Ayrshire, Scotland. The station was originally part of the Glasgow, Paisley, Kilmarnock and Ayr Railway.

History 
The station opened on 9 August 1848, and closed on 3 July 1950.

References 
 

Disused railway stations in East Ayrshire
Railway stations in Great Britain opened in 1848
Railway stations in Great Britain closed in 1950
Former Glasgow and South Western Railway stations